Roland Daniel Martin (born January 11, 1949) is an American politician who currently serves as a member of the Maine House of Representatives. He previously served one term in the House before being elected to the Maine Senate in 1976.

References

External links

1949 births
Living people
Democratic Party members of the Maine House of Representatives
20th-century American politicians
21st-century American politicians
People from Aroostook County, Maine
Democratic Party Maine state senators